John David Vanderhoof (May 27, 1922 – September 19, 2013) was an American politician. A member of the Republican Party, Vanderhoof served as the 37th Governor of Colorado from 1973–1975, assuming the office from John Arthur Love, who was appointed to the National Energy Policy Office by President Richard Nixon. Vanderhoof served out the remainder of Love's term, but failed to win a term in his own right, being defeated by Democrat Richard Lamm in the 1974 election.

Early life and career
Born in Rocky Ford, Colorado, Vanderhoof graduated from Glendale College in California in 1942 and joined the Navy.

He served in Naval Aviation during World War II, flying over 100 sorties as a fighter pilot. In 1945, he suffered a broken leg when his aircraft was shot down near the Philippines and his parachute malfunctioned. Vanderhoof received two Purple Hearts, the Distinguished Flying Cross and three Air Medals for his service from 1943 to 1945.

After the war, he worked in the family sporting goods business and later became a bank executive.

Vanderhoof was elected to the  Colorado House of Representatives in 1950, and served twenty years until 1970. He was a former chairman of the Game and Fish Committee and Business Affairs Committee of the House. Minority floor leader during the 43rd General Assembly and elected Speaker of the House for the 44th, 46th, and 47th General Assemblies.

In 1970, he became the first lieutenant governor elected under a new constitutional provision calling for the joint election of Governor and Lieutenant Governor.

In 1974, Vanderhoof sought election as Governor in his own right. In the Republican primary, Vanderhoof dispatched conservative cable television executive Bill Daniels with over 60% of the vote. He was defeated in the 1974 general election by State Senator Richard Lamm, 53% to 46%.

Colorado Apollo 17 Goodwill Moon Rock
In 2010, Richard Kevin Griffis, a graduate student at the University of Phoenix was assigned the task of tracking down the Apollo 17 Goodwill Moon Rock by his Professor Joseph Gutheinz. He discovered that the Colorado Apollo 17 Goodwill Moon Rock was missing, which led to the admission by Vanderhoof that he had possession of one of two Colorado Moon rock displays that was presented to the state of Colorado by President Richard Nixon in the 1970s. Vanderhoof voluntarily surrendered the rock, which at the time was estimated to be worth $5 million. The rock was subsequently put on display at the Colorado School of Mines Geology Museum.

Death
He died on September 19, 2013, aged 91, in Glenwood Springs, Colorado.

References

External links
 Colorado State Archives

|-

|-

1922 births
2013 deaths
20th-century American politicians
American bankers
United States Navy personnel of World War II
American United Methodists
Businesspeople from Colorado
Republican Party members of the Colorado House of Representatives
Glendale Community College (California) alumni
Republican Party governors of Colorado
Lieutenant Governors of Colorado
Military personnel from Colorado
People from Glenwood Springs, Colorado
People from Rocky Ford, Colorado
Recipients of the Distinguished Flying Cross (United States)
Shot-down aviators
Speakers of the Colorado House of Representatives
United States Naval Aviators
United States Navy officers
20th-century American businesspeople
20th-century Methodists